Shariatpur (Shariatpur Jela also Shariatpur Zila) is a district in the Dhaka Division of central Bangladesh. It is bounded by Munshiganj district on the north, Barisal district on the south, Chandpur district on the east, Madaripur district on the west. Water bodies Main rivers: Padma, Meghna, Palong (Kirtinasha) and Jayanti. Of the six upazilas of the district Bhedarganj Upazila is the largest and Damudya Upazila is the smallest.

History
Shariatpur was named after Haji Shariatullah (1781–1840), who was the founder of Faraizi Movement and an eminent Islamic reformer/revivalist during British Raj. It was established as a district on 1 March 1984.

In 1971 the Pak army in collaboration with their local agents conducted mass killing and plundering; they also set many houses of the district on fire. During Bangladesh Liberation War a number of encounters were held in Shariatpur Sadar Upazila between the freedom fighters and the Pak army in which about 313 Pak soldiers were killed. A number of freedom fighters were killed in two encounters and one frontal battle with the Pak army in Bhedarganj Upazila. Nine freedom fighters including Ahsanul Hoque and Abdul Wahab were killed in an encounter with the Pak army at a place on the southern side of Damudya College. Muktijoddha and Mujib Bahini jointly conducted attack on the Pak army by guerrilla technique in the upazila. Five freedom fighters were killed in an encounter with the Pak army in Gosairhat Upazila. The freedom fighters of Naria raided the Naria Police Station and captured all the arms and ammunitions of the thana. In retaliation, the Pak army sacked the nearby villages. During Bangladesh Liberation War a number of encounters were held between the freedom fighters and the Pak army in Zanjira Upazila in which a number of freedom fighters were killed.

Geography
Shariatpur District is bounded on the north by Munshiganj District, Barisal District on the south, Chandpur District on the east, Madaripur District on the west. Main rivers are Padma, Meghna, Palong, Jayanti, Kirtinasha, and Dharmaganj.

It consists of 6 upazilas, 6 municipalities, 65 Union Parishad, 616 Mouza, 1243 villages, 213,677 households.

Demography

According to the 2011 Bangladesh census, Shariatpur district had a population was 1,155,824, of which 559,075 were males and 596,749 females. Rural population was 1,024,780 (88.66%) while the urban population was 131,044 (11.34%). Shariatpur district had a literacy rate of 47.26% for the population 7 years and above: 47.96% for males and 46.62% for females.

Muslims make up 96.40% of the population, while Hindus are 3.58% of the population. The Muslim population has constantly increased while the Hindu population has stayed relatively constant.

Administration
There are six upazilas (sub-districts) under this district, namely:
 Shariatpur Sadar Upazila
 Damudya Upazila
 Naria Upazila
 Zanjira Upazila
 Bhedarganj Upazila
 Gosairhat Upazila

Education

There are 772 primary schools, 19 lower secondary schools, 83 secondary schools and 42 Madrasas in Shariatpur. There are also 3 Public and 13 Private Colleges, 1 polytechnic Institute, 1 Vocational School and College, 1 Private University and one private medical college. The literacy rate (7+ year) 60% (Male 63%, Female 57%) and literacy rate (15+ year) 41% (Male 47%, Female 36%).

Notable Personalities
 T.M. Giasuddin Ahmed, former MP
 Shawkat Ali (politician)
 Iqbal Hossain Apu, MP
 K.M. Hemayet Ullah Auranga, politician
 Aminul Islam Biplob (cricketer)
 Khuda Buksh (1912–1974) regarded as father of insurance in Bangladesh
 Pulin Behari Das (revolutionary)
 Jogesh Chandra Ghosh (scholar, Ayurveda physician, entrepreneur and philanthropist)
 AKM Shahidul Haque (Former Inspector General of Police, Bangladesh)
 B.M Muzammel Haque, politician
 Farzana Islam, (academician)
 Sardar AKM Nasiruddin, former MP
 Kamrun Nesa Nilu, former MP
 Master Majibur Rahman, former MP
 Abdur Razzaq (former minister of water resources)
 Nahim Razzaq, MP
 AKM Enamul Haque Shamim, MP
 Siraj Sikder (politician)
 Abdul Haque Faridi (academic)

See also
 Districts of Bangladesh
 Dhaka Division

Notes

References

 
Districts of Bangladesh